Chiara Matraini (1515–1604) was an Italian Renaissance writer from Lucca. Primarily known for her love poetry, composed in the style of Petrarch, she also authored a number of spiritual prose and verse texts. Matraini wrote throughout her long life, publishing her last text, the Dialoghi spirituali (1602), when she was well into her 80s. Her many projects included genres that were uncommon for women writers of her time, such as an oration on the art of war, a translation from Latin to vernacular, and several didactic religious texts. Matraini's writing demonstrates an eagerness to compose in an authoritative voice.

Her father died soon after she was born, she was entrusted to the care of her uncle  until she was married to Vincenzo Cantarini, with whom she had one son. Her husband's early death apparently facilitated  her active literary life. Her literary contacts included Benedetto Varchi and Lodovico Domenichi.

Selected works
Rime et prose, Lucca, Busdraghi, 1555.
Orazione d'Isocrate, Florence, Torrentino, 1556.
Meditationi spirituali, Lucca, Busdraghi, 1581.
Lettere di madonna Chiara Matraini... con la prima e seconda parte delle sue rime, Venice, Nicolò Moretti, 1597.
Dialoghi spirituali, Venice, Prati, 1602.
Rime e lettere, edited by Giovanna Rabitti, Bologna, 1989.
Brief discourse on the life and praises of the most blessed Virgin, in Who is Mary?, edited and translated by Susan Haskins, Chicago, 2008.
Selected Poetry and Prose, edited and translated by Elaine Maclachlan, Chicago, 2008.

References

External links

See also
Renaissance Literature
 16th century in poetry
 16th century in literature

1515 births
1604 deaths
Italian women poets
16th-century Italian women writers